Ignacio Antinori (February 17, 1885 – October 23, 1940) was an Italian-born American mobster who built one of the earlier narcotics trafficking networks in Florida. Antinori was regarded as the first boss of the Tampa crime family, later known as the Trafficante crime family.

Although much of his early life is unknown, Antinori was one of the first mobsters to emerge in Florida during the Prohibition era. By the 1930s, Antinori was one of the largest heroin traffickers in the country, with close ties to French-Corsican heroin traffickers and American mafia bosses. Antinori established a drug pipeline from Marseille, France through Cuba into Tampa, Florida.  According to the Federal Bureau of Narcotics, the drugs were subsequently distributed in the Midwestern United States, primarily through St. Louis mobster Thomas Buffa and Kansas City mobsters Nicola Impastato, James DeSimone and Joseph Deluca.

Law enforcement soon began to concentrate on Antinori's operation. In addition, mobsters such as Florida mobster Santo Trafficante Sr. soon set up rival smuggling rings. Antinori was eventually eclipsed by Trafficante, who held his own strong connections to Mangano crime family boss Vincent Mangano and Profaci crime family boss Joseph Profaci in New York.

On October 23, 1940, Ignacio Antinori was sipping coffee at the Palm Garden Inn in Tampa with a friend and a young female companion. Suddenly, a gunman appeared and fired two shotgun blasts at Antinori, blowing off the back of his head. The gunman was allegedly sent by one of Antinori's dissatisfied customers, the Chicago Outfit criminal organization. Antinori had sent the Outfit a poor quality shipment of narcotics. When the Outfit complained, Antinori refused a refund. At that point, the Outfit put a murder contract on Antinori.

References

Bibliography 
Sifakis, Carl  The Mafia Encyclopedia. New York: Da Capo Press, 2005. 
Deiche, Scott M.  Cigar City Mafia - A Complete History of the Tampa Underworld, Barricode Books, 3-25-2004, ASIN# 8004449516.

External links
American Mafia.com The KC/Tampa Drug Connection By Scott M. Deitche

1885 births
1940 deaths
Gangsters from Palermo
Trafficante crime family
Murdered American gangsters of Sicilian descent
People murdered in Florida
Male murder victims
Deaths by firearm in Florida
Italian emigrants to the United States
People murdered by the Chicago Outfit